Pat is a neighborhood in southwestern Jerusalem, located between Katamon in the north and Beit Safafa in the south.

History
The Pat neighborhood is named for Yaacov Pat, a commander of the Haganah.

Pat was the last of the Katamonim neighborhoods built in the 1950s to provide housing for residents of the Maabara transit camps and other socio-economically weak populations. The main thoroughfare is Yaacov Pat Street, which separates it from Katamon Het. 

In the 1990s, under the auspices of "Project Renewal," apartment blocks in Pat were expanded and faced with Jerusalem stone.  The construction of Malha Mall, Teddy Stadium and the Jerusalem Railway Station, which are all near Pat, along with the development of the Talpiot industrial zone and the construction of the Begin Expressway, have increased property values.

Education and culture
Institutions include a religious high school – ORT Spanian, Pat community center and a branch of  Mishmar HaEzrahi. Also located in Pat is the WIZO Institute, a Tipat Halav mother and child station, and the Nishmat Torah institute for women.

In 1981, the Jerusalem Foundation established a park and sports center on an area of 45 dunams that includes a Jerusalem Pine grove, a playground and sports facilities. In 2005-2007, the park was renovated and renamed the Mama Betty Park and Sports Center.

In 2007, the Max Rayne School, a bilingual Hebrew–Arabic school was founded in Pat, open to all Jewish and Arab children in Jerusalem.

References

External links
Ulrich Park in Pat

Neighbourhoods of Jerusalem